Hoogezand-Sappemeer (abbreviation: Hgz) is an unstaffed railway station in Hoogezand in the Netherlands. It is located on the Harlingen–Nieuweschans railway between Martenshoek and Sappemeer Oost in the province of Groningen. Train services started in 1868 and the current station building was completed in 1989. There are currently three train services, all operated by Arriva. Among the direct destinations are Groningen to the west, Veendam to the southeast, and Winschoten, Bad Nieuweschans, and Leer (Germany) to the east.

Location 
The railway station is located at the Stationsweg in the municipality of Midden-Groningen in the south of the province of Groningen in the northeast of the Netherlands. It is situated on the Harlingen–Nieuweschans railway between the railway stations Martenshoek and Sappemeer Oost.

Building and layout 

The former station building was completed in 1865. It was designed by Karel Hendrik van Brederode. The building was demolished in 1989.

The signal box from the station is now at the Railway Museum in Utrecht.

The current station building was completed in 1989. It was designed by Rob Steenhuis.

At the station, the double track has two separate platforms.

Train services

Bus services

References

External links 

 Hoogezand-Sappemeer station, station information

1868 establishments in the Netherlands
Buildings and structures completed in 1865
Buildings and structures completed in 1989
Buildings and structures demolished in 1989
Railway stations in Groningen (province)
Railway stations on the Staatslijn B
Railway stations opened in 1868
Transport in Midden-Groningen
Railway stations in the Netherlands opened in the 19th century